The elections for the Shimla Municipal Corporation were held on May 2017. The number of wards was increased to 34 from the earlier 25 wards.

Overview

The Bharatiya Janata Party became the single largest party in the 2017 Municipal Corporation elections with 17 out of the 34 seats, falling short of a majority by just 1 seat, creating history by winning in the bastion of the Indian National Congress and formed the new city government. It was the first time in the history of Shimla Municipal Corporation that the BJP had managed to secure a win. Soon after the results, 1 independent corporator, joined BJP helping it reach the majority mark. BJP candidate Satya Kanudal was elected as the mayor of Shimla, with the party bagging the post for the first time. The Communist Party of India (Marxist) which had won the previous mayoral election and bagged 3 seats fell back to 1 seat in a setback to the party.

Result

See also

2022 Shimla Municipal Corporation election
Shimla Municipal Corporation

References

Shimla
Shimla
2017 elections in India
Local body elections in Himachal Pradesh